James L. Crawford House, also known as Lackawanna County House of Detention, was a historic home located at Scranton, Lackawanna County, Pennsylvania. It was built in 1898, and was a Tudor Revival style dwelling.

It was added to the National Register of Historic Places in 1980.  It was delisted in 1992, after being demolished in 1991.

References

External links
Crawford House history in article "Deaths put house in eerie light," http://thetimes-tribune.com, October 31, 2010.

Houses on the National Register of Historic Places in Pennsylvania
Houses completed in 1898
Buildings and structures in Scranton, Pennsylvania
Houses in Lackawanna County, Pennsylvania
National Register of Historic Places in Lackawanna County, Pennsylvania
Demolished buildings and structures in Pennsylvania
Buildings and structures demolished in 1991